Vodafone Italia S.p.A. is an Italian telecommunications company, subsidiary of Vodafone Group Plc. It has 30,153,000 mobile phone customers and 3,182,000 fixed phone lines, with respectively a market share of 28.5% and 16%.

The company's headquarters are in Ivrea (TO) and Milan.

Since taking over the company, Vodafone has introduced in Italy services like Vodafone live!, the 3G, 4G and 5G mobile networks, DSL, fiber-optic and FWA services, and Mobile Virtual Network Operators for other corporations.

Vodafone's main competitors are FASTWEB, Iliad, TIM and Wind Tre.

History 
In December 1995, Omnitel Sistemi Radiocellulari Italiani S.p.A. (founded on June 19, 1990, by Olivetti, Lehman Brothers, Bell Atlantic and Telia) and Pronto Italia S.p.A. (made up of Zignago Vetro, AirTouch, Mannesmann, Banca di Roma, Arca merchant, Comeba, Ersel, ERG, Urmet TLC, Spal TLC, Site, Ponti Radio and Fergia) merged into Omnitel Pronto Italia S.p.A., which launched a mobile telephony service, the second in Italy after TIM (formerly SIP). Olivetti, the original majority shareholder, through Omnitel and Infostrada (which dealt instead with fixed telephony), thus competed with Telecom Italia, which until then monopolized the entire telecommunications sector in Italy.

In 1999 Olivetti sold its interest in Omnitel and Infostrada to the German consortium Mannesmann, after Olivetti took control of Telecom Italia.

By 1999, Mannesmann had a majority stake in Omnitel with a 53.7% equity stake. The following year, Vodafone merged with Mannesmann thereby taking control of Omnitel. The merger led in 2002 to the change of company name to Vodafone Omnitel S.p.A., and in the same year the registered office was transferred to Amsterdam, changing the name again to Vodafone Omnitel N.V., legally registered in the Netherlands.

In 2004, the company launched UMTS services in 140 cities and, two years later, also HSPA services.

In 2007, Vodafone bought the Italian and Spanish branches of Tele2.

Following the acquisition of Tele2 Italia (in 2010 renamed TeleTu), in 2008, Vodafone launched in Italy XDSL services, offering Wi-Fi and VoIP to its customers, and between 2013 and 2014, launched also FTTX services.

In 2012 has enabled LTE technology services in Milan and Rome.

On 16 December 2013, following Verizon's sale of the entire share capital held in the company to Vodafone, it was transformed into Vodafone Omnitel B.V.

Between 2014 and 2015, started enabling LTE-A and VoLTE services to its mobile customers, and in 2017 launched LTE-A Pro services in Milan, Palermo and Florence.

On 23 November 2015, the company moved its legal residence in Turin, changing its name to Vodafone Italia S.p.A., returning to be a company legally registered in Italy.

On 23 January 2017, Vodafone founded the subsidiary Vodafone Enabler Italia (VEI) to provide low-cost mobile telephony services in competition with Iliad.

In 2019 launched 5G NR services in Milan, Rome, Turin, Naples and Bologna. Its GigaNetwork 5G is considered the evolution of the previous GigaNetwork 4.5G, which has been re-used to launch the 5G service.

In 2021 the company shuts down its 3G network, in order to enhance the 4G and 5G ones.

Brand identity 
Evolution of the company brand and logo:

 In 1994 the company debuted on the market with the Omnitel brand.
 In 2001, following the takeover of Vodafone as shareholder, the brand became Omnitel Vodafone.
 In 2002 the brand was changed to Vodafone Omnitel, to symbolize the progressive transition from Omnitel to Vodafone.
 In 2003, the Omnitel brand was definitively abandoned in favor of Vodafone.

Network and coverage

Mobile network 
As of March 31, 2022 Vodafone Italia's mobile network is made from 21,785 physical sites, including:
 21,000 base transceiver stations LTE (4G);
 1,300 base transceiver stations NR (5G).

The national mobile network covers:

International roaming 
Vodafone Italia has signed international roaming agreements with 731 operators in 241 countries. As of June 30, 2016, about 150 of these operators in 100 countries allow customers to reach 4G LTE coverage.

Fixed network 
Vodafone Italia's fixed network includes 1,254 sites ULL, 326 sites SLU and 19,000 ONU (cabinet) in fiber-optic (FTTC).

Customers

Mobile telephony 
 18.17 million mobile lines (for a market share of 23.3%)
  14.69 million consumer mobile lines (21.6%) and  3.43 million business mobile lines (34.4%)
  15.43 million prepaid mobile lines (22.3%) and  2.71 million subscription mobile lines (30.7%)

Fixed telephony 
 3.18 million of total fixed lines (for a market share of 16%)
  447.400 fixed broadband lines (for a market share of 10.1%)
  2.60 million fixed ultra-broadband lines (for a market share of 18%)

M2M 
 11.98 million SIM (of which 47% is used in applications of info-mobility and Smart card)

See also 
 ho.
 Vodafone Group
 Verizon

References

External links 

 

Vodafone
Companies based in Milan
Telecommunications companies established in 2003
Mobile phone companies of Italy
Italian companies established in 2003